The Siau pitta or Siao pitta (Erythropitta palliceps) is a species of the pitta. It was considered a subspecies of the red-bellied pitta.  It is endemic to Indonesia where it occurs in Siau and Tagulandang.  Its natural habitat is subtropical or tropical moist lowland forests.  It is threatened by habitat loss.

References

Siao pitta
Birds of the Sangihe Islands
Siao pitta